Donald Johnson and Jared Palmer were the defending champions but did not compete that year.

Paul Hanley and Nathan Healey won in the final 7–6 (7–3), 6–4 against Mahesh Bhupathi and Joshua Eagle.

Seeds
Champion seeds are indicated in bold text while text in italics indicates the round in which those seeds were eliminated.

 Mark Knowles /  Daniel Nestor (semifinals)
 Bob Bryan /  Mike Bryan (semifinals)
 Mahesh Bhupathi /  Joshua Eagle (final)
 Martin Damm /  Cyril Suk (quarterfinals)

Draw

External links
 Main Draw

2003 Adidas International
2003 ATP Tour